Yablunets is an urban-type settlement in Zviahel Raion, Zhytomyr Oblast, Ukraine. Population:

History 
It was a village in Zhitomirsky Uyezd of the Volhynian Governorate of the Russian Empire.

In January 1989 the population was 1497 people.

References

Urban-type settlements in Zviahel Raion
Zhitomirsky Uyezd